Sulit TV (stylized in lowercase) is a Philippine ISDB-T digital terrestrial television provider owned and operated by TV5 Network. The service distributes digital set-top boxes with free-to-air digital TV channels, multimedia player, video recorder, broadcast markup language, and emergency warning broadcast system features available in select areas in the Philippines. Sulit TV launched on September 10, 2021.

Channel lineup

UHF Channel 18 (497.143 MHz)/UHF Channel 51 (695.143 MHz)1

1 For Mega Manila only, channel and frequency varies on regional stations.

Channel and frequency

See also
 Digital terrestrial television in the Philippines
 ABS-CBN TV Plus Digital TV Receiver
 GMA Affordabox
 Easy TV (defunct)

References

TV5 Network
Digital television in the Philippines
Products introduced in 2021
2021 establishments in the Philippines